Archeosofica is a school of esoteric Christianity founded by Tommaso Palamidessi in 1968 in Rome. It offers a program of research on Archeosophy.

The school is free and supplies booklets and other texts.

Beliefs
Archeosofica proposes a form of "ascesis" or asceticism:
 Physiological and psychosomatic asceticism to maintain physical well-being.
 Social asceticism, which is the effort and action to become a perfect citizen and to make oneself a spokesman of a "new society".
 Mystical asceticism through intense devotion.
 Theurgical asceticism, or ritual asceticism.
 Magical asceticism.
 Cosmic asceticism.
 "Sapiential" and "initiatic" asceticism, or the spiritual elevation of oneself through knowledge and practice.

Subjects of Archeosophy are explained in a series of booklets. There are about 50 Booklets on various subjects such as esoteric Christianity, reincarnation, out of body experiences, meditation, clairvoyance, esotericism, alchemy, religious symbolism, mysticism, and so on.

Select bibliography 

 I poteri occulti dell'uomo e lo yoga tantrico indo-tibetano, Turin: Spartaco Giovene, 1945 (2nd ed. Archeosofica 1988, 3rd ed. Arkeios ).
 La tecnica sessuale dello yoga tantrico indo-tibetano, Turin: Edizioni Grande Opera, 1948 (2nd ed. Archeosofica 1988, 3rd ed. Arkeios ).
 Archeosofia, 5 volumes, Rome: Archeosofica, 1985-1988 (2nd ed. Arkeios 2001).

See also
 Archeosophical Society
 Archeosophy
 Tommaso Palamidessi

References

External links
The Official Site of the Archeosophical Society
The Official Site of the Italian Archeosofica

Esoteric Christianity
Esoteric schools of thought